The 1917 Copa del Rey Final was the 17th final of the Spanish cup competition, the Copa del Rey. The final was played at Camp de la Indústria in Barcelona on 13 May 1917. The match ended without goals after twenty minutes of extra-time. The replay match was played two days later, in the same venue with the same referee. The match ended 1–1, and the teams decided to play twenty minutes of extra time. Neither team scored a goal in that time, so they decided to play another twenty minutes of extra time. Three minutes in the second period of extra time, Ricardo Álvarez scored for Madrid FC, thus sealing the fifth title for Madrid.

Match details

Final

Replay

References

External links
linguasport.com
RSSSF.com
MundoDeportivo.com 
Marca.com 
AS.com 

1917
Copa
Real Madrid CF matches
Arenas Club de Getxo matches
May 1917 sports events
1910s in Barcelona
Sports competitions in Barcelona
1917 in Catalonia